Luke's Movie Muddle is a 1916 American short comedy film starring Harold Lloyd. Prints of the film survive in various film archives around the world, including George Eastman House and the Filmoteca Española.

Cast
 Harold Lloyd as Luke
 Bebe Daniels
 Snub Pollard as Projectionist
 Charles Stevenson (as Charles E. Stevenson)
 Billy Fay
 Fred C. Newmeyer
 Sammy Brooks
 Harry Todd
 Bud Jamison
 Margaret Joslin (as Mrs. Harry Todd)
 Earl Mohan as Customer with glasses
 Eva Thatcher (as Evelyn Thatcher)

See also
 Harold Lloyd filmography

References

External links

 Luke's Movie Muddle on YouTube

1916 films
1916 short films
American silent short films
American black-and-white films
Lonesome Luke films
Films directed by Hal Roach
1916 comedy films
Silent American comedy films
American comedy short films
1910s American films